Société de Transports de l'Agglomération Stéphanoise, or STAS operates a public transport network and infrastructure in and around Saint-Étienne. Its responsibility is to provide tramway, trolleybus and bus service in the fifty-three communes of the Saint-Étienne agglomeration.

History

The company's official name, although not used is the TPAS and is a Société Anonyme with a capital of 17 700 000 euros. Its main shareholder, Transdev is the parent company. STAS was created on 1 April 2000.

Depots

STAS maintains its rolling stock from three sites:
Transpôle depot at Saint-Priest-en-Jarez (company headquarters, 9 hectares)
Transparc depot at Saint-Étienne (2 hectares)
Saint-Chamond depot

and is also responsible for sites throughout the Saint-Étienne:
An information point and reseller, Place Dorian in Saint-Étienne
park and ride at Saint-Priest-en-Jarez
Musée des Transports Urbains de Saint-Étienne et sa Région, transport museum.

Fleet

The STAS providing a diverse array of service possesses a diverse fleet, of which includes:

Trolleybus

Irisbus Cristalis

Bus
Heuliez GX 117
Irisbus Agora
Mercedes-Benz Citaro
Renault Agora articulated
Citaro Facelift
Citaro C2
Citelis 12
Citelis 18
Urbanway 12
Urbanway 18
Heuliez GX 127
Heuliez GX 327

Tramway
Tramway Français Standard
CAF Urbos 3

Bicycles
Vélivert bike sharing program with 400 long term renting and 300 short term renting bicycles.

External links
STAS

Public transport operators in France
Bus companies of France
Transdev
Transport in Saint-Étienne
Veolia
Transport in Auvergne-Rhône-Alpes